Beaver Lake may refer to:

Lakes

Antarctica
Beaver Lake (Antarctica)

Canada
Beaver Lake (Alberta)
Beaver Lake (Vancouver), British Columbia
Beaver Lake (Victoria, British Columbia)
Beaver Lake (Montreal)
Beaver Lakes (Annapolis), Nova Scotia
Beaver Lake (Halifax), Nova Scotia, the name of several lakes
Beaver Lake (Inverness), Nova Scotia
Beaver Lake (Pictou), Nova Scotia
Beaver Lake (Queens), Nova Scotia
Beaver Lake (Shelburne), Nova Scotia
Beaver Lake (Victoria, Nova Scotia)
Beaver Lake (Yarmouth), Nova Scotia
Beaver Lake (Saskatchewan)

United States
Beaver Lake (Alaska), site of Beaver Lake Dam
Beaver Lake (Arkansas)
Beaver Lake (Newton County, Indiana), now drained
Beaver Lake (Kentucky)
Beaver Lake, Steele County, Minnesota
Beaver Lake (Montana), a lake in Missoula County
Beaver Lake (Nevada)
Beaver Lake (Hamilton County, New York)
Beaver Lake (New York), in Lewis County
Beaver Lake State Park (North Dakota)
Beaver Lake (Minnehaha County, South Dakota)
Beaver Lake (Yankton County, South Dakota)
Beaver Lake (Texas)
Beaver Lake (Clallam County, Washington), on Washington State Route 113
Beaver Lake (King County, Washington)

Places

Canada
Beaver Lake 131, Alberta
Beaver Lake Cree Nation, a First Nations band government 
Beaver Lake, Alberta
Beaver Lake, Ontario, a community within the city of Greater Sudbury
Beaver Lake 17, Nova Scotia, a Mi'kmaq reserve

United States
Beaver Lake, Michigan, Klacking Township
Beaver Lake Middle School, in Issaquah School District, Washington
Beaver Lake Nature Center, Baldwinsville, Onondaga County, New York
Beaver Lake Park (Washington), a park in Sammamish

See also

Beaver Dam (disambiguation)
Beaver Lake Mountains, in Utah, U.S.
Beaver Lake point, a projectile point of the Paleoindian period
Beaver Lake Seaplane Base, Alaska, U.S.
 , see Boats of the Mackenzie River watershed
Beaver Woman Lake, in Glacier National Park, Montana, U.S.